Avīci (01) is the fourth and final extended play by Swedish DJ and record producer Avicii. It was produced by Avicii, Benny Blanco, Andrew Watt, Cashmere Cat and Carl Falk, and released through Avicii Music on 10 August 2017.

Background
On 27 June 2017, Rita Ora debuted a semi-acoustic version of "Lonely Together" at a private event at Annabel's in London. Avicii then shared one-minute snippets on Instagram, captioned "New music coming very very (very) soon!", with track titles as hashtags, followed by teasers of each track from the EP upon release. He said of the release: "I'm really excited to be back with music once again.  It has been a long time since I released anything and a long time since I was this excited over new music! My focus on this first EP of the album was to get a mix of new and old songs: some that fans have been asking about and waiting for mixed with brand new songs that they have never been heard before!" 

In an interview with Pete Tong on BBC Radio 1, Avicii stated: "It's the first EP of 3, so the whole album will be released with the third EP." However, after Avicii's death in 2018, the EPs were cancelled and replaced with the posthumous release of Tim in 2019. As of January 2022, (01) remains the only EP in the series released.

Critical reception

Ryan Milk of Dancing Astronaut labelled the EP as a "refreshed and reenergized take on [Avicii's] happy, upbeat progressive style". Brian Bonavoglia from DJ Times wrote that Avīci (01) featured Avicii returning to his roots with tracks that contain his "signature production style built around infectious melodies" which "create the uplifting energy that helped propel him into stardom". Renowned For Sounds Haydon Benfield felt that although the tracks were "tightly focused and highly polished" in their production, they lacked elements which were worthy of praise. The critic concluded by describing Avicii's style as "interminable, incessant, and uninterrupted."

Track listing

Notes
"Lonely Together" features additional vocals by Ali Tamposi, Brian Lee and Andrew Watt.
"Without You" features backing vocals by Carl Falk, Dhani Lennevald and Marcus Thunberg Wessel.
"So Much Better" features vocals by Sandro Cavazza.

Charts

Weekly charts

Year-end charts

Certifications

References

2017 EPs
Avicii albums
Albums produced by Benny Blanco
Albums produced by Cashmere Cat